Jacek Huchwajda (born 3 April 1967) is a German fencer. He competed in the team sabre event at the 1992 Summer Olympics. He currently serves as an assistant coach on the Duke University Fencing team.

Biography
Jacek Huchwajda attended the Kaufmännische Schule Tauberbischofsheim and fought for the Fencing-Club Tauberbischofsheim.

References

External links
 

1967 births
Living people
German male fencers
Olympic fencers of Germany
Fencers at the 1992 Summer Olympics
Sportspeople from Poznań
German people of Polish descent
20th-century German people